An incomplete list of films produced in Brazil in the 1920s. For an alphabetical list of films currently on Wikipedia see :Category:Brazilian films

1920

External links
 Brazilian film at the Internet Movie Database

1920s
Brazilian
Films